Maharashtra State Highway 200 (MH SH 200) is a normal state highway that starts from Bazargaon at the junction of NH-6 and ends at Maharashtra–Madhya Pradesh border near Kelwad Village. The portion of this highway from Saoner to the Maharashtra-Madhya Pradesh border near Kelwad is common with NH-26B

References

250